The 2020 African Volleyball Championship U21 was held in Cairo, Egypt from 20 to 24 February 2021. The top two teams of the tournament qualified for the 2021 FIVB Volleyball Men's U21 World Championship.

Egypt finished the 4-team round-robin tournament on top of the standing to clinch their fifth title.

Qualification
5 CAVB under-21 national teams have registered to participate in the 2020 African Championship U21. But, Central African Republic later withdrew.

 (Hosts)

Squads

Venue
 Cairo Stadium Indoor Hall 2, Cairo, Egypt

Pool standing procedure
 Number of matches won
 Match points
 Sets ratio
 Points ratio
 Result of the last match between the tied teams

Match won 3–0 or 3–1: 3 match points for the winner, 0 match points for the loser
Match won 3–2: 2 match points for the winner, 1 match point for the loser

Round robin
All times are Egypt Standard Time (UTC+02:00).

|}

|}

Final standing

Awards

Most Valuable Player
 Marawan El Safy
Best Spiker
 Driss Mostari
Best Blocker
 Derrick Deffo
Best Server
 Ahmed Abelazeem Mido

Best Setter
 Anas Shawky
Best Receiver
 Abdelrahman El Hossini
Best Libero
 Stephanie Mana

References

External links
African Volleyball Confederation – official website
Squads

African Volleyball Championship U21
Volleyball Championship U21
2021 in Egyptian sport
International volleyball competitions hosted by Egypt
African Volleyball